Cats on Trees is a French musical duo formed in Toulouse (Occitanie), France in 2007 by Nina Goern (on vocals and piano) and Yohan Hennequin (rhythms). Before the duo, Goern was part of Aeria Microcosm and Hennequin part of My Own Private Alaska. The duo specializing in ambient indie pop released their EP followed by their debut self-titled album in 2013 Cats on Trees. "Sirens Call" is the duo's first single.

Discography

Albums

Singles

*Did not appear in the official Belgian Ultratop 50 charts, but rather in the bubbling under Ultratip charts.

References

External links
Official website
Facebook
YouTube

French musical duos
Pop music duos
French pop music groups
Male–female musical duos